Dowling Creek (also called Dulin Creek) is a stream in Jefferson County in the U.S. state of Missouri. It is a tributary to Heads Creek.

The stream passes under Missouri Route 30 about one mile before it enters Heads Creek.

Dowling Creek derives its name from a local family.

See also
List of rivers of Missouri

References

Rivers of Jefferson County, Missouri
Rivers of Missouri